Allobates sanmartini is a species of frog in the family Aromobatidae. It is endemic to Venezuela. Its natural habitats are subtropical or tropical moist lowland forest, rivers, freshwater marshes, and intermittent freshwater marshes. It is threatened by habitat loss.

References

sanmartini
Amphibians of Venezuela
Endemic fauna of Venezuela
Taxonomy articles created by Polbot
Amphibians described in 1986